The members of the National Lacrosse Hall of Fame are inducted by US Lacrosse and are enshrined at the National Lacrosse Hall of Fame. Members have been inducted into the hall of fame annually since 1957. The National Lacrosse Hall of Fame and Museum moved to US Lacrosse's new headquarters in Sparks, Maryland in 2016.

Individuals are nominated in four distinct categories: players, coaches, contributors, or officials. Each year, the nominating and voting process takes place from January through April. The annual class of inductees is publicly announced over Memorial Day weekend in May, in conjunction with the NCAA Men's Championships held the same weekend. They are then officially inducted at a ceremony in September or October.

In 1992, Rosabelle Sinclair, a pioneer of the women's game, was the first woman to be inducted into the Hall of Fame. Since Sinclair, there have been 76 other woman inductees, and, combined with 287 men, there are 364 total inductees as of the 2010 class.

Hall of Fame inductees

  
Source:

Schools/affiliations by number of inductees

Only includes schools/affiliations with more than five inductees
Source:

See also
 List of Canadian Lacrosse Hall of Fame members
 US Lacrosse chapter halls of fame
 US Intercollegiate Lacrosse Association All-American Team
 Tewaaraton Trophy

References

Notes

External links
National Lacrosse Hall of Fame

Lacrosse in the United States
Lacrosse museums and halls of fame
Lacrosse
Awards established in 1957
Hall of fame
College sports halls of fame in the United States